Following is a list of senators of Mayotte, people who have represented the overseas department of Mayotte in the Senate of France.

Fifth Republic 

Senators for Mayotte under the French Fifth Republic were:

References

Sources

 
Lists of members of the Senate (France) by department